McMurtry is a surname. Notable people with the surname include:

Chuck McMurtry (1937–1984), American football player (defensive tackle)
Craig McMurtry (born 1959), American baseball player (pitcher)
David McMurtry (born 1940), Irish businessman, founder of Renishaw plc
George G. McMurtry (1876–1958), Captain, U.S. Army; received Medal of Honor
Grady McMurtry (1918–1985), American occultist
Greg McMurtry (born 1967), American football player (wide receiver)
James McMurtry (born 1962), American musician
John McMurtry, Canadian philosopher
John McMurtry (1812–1890), American architect
Larry McMurtry (1936–2021), American novelist, father of James McMurtry
Robert McMurtry, Canadian physician
Roy McMurtry (born 1932), Canadian politician and Chief Justice of Ontario
Sharon McMurtry (born 1960), American retired soccer player
Stanley McMurtry (born 1936), British cartoonist
Thomas McMurtry (born 1935), American test pilot for NASA
William McMurtry (1801–1875), American politician and military officer

Other uses 
 McMurtry Spéirling, a 2021 electric concept car